I Got the Hook-Up is a 1998 American crime comedy film, starring Anthony Johnson, Master P, Ice Cube, C-Murder and directed by Michael Martin.  This was No Limit Records' first theatrical release. The movie was distributed by Dimension Films.

Plot
Working out of their van, Black (Master P) and Blue (Johnson) deal in TV sets and boomboxes, but then a driver mistakenly drops off a cell phone shipment. Business is on the upswing, but then the local crime boss, Roscoe, and his enforcer, T-Lay (Tom Lister Jr.), have a deal go sour and blame Black and Blue. Lorraine's boss Dalton and the FBI are also closing in.

Cast
 Master P as Black
 A. J. Johnson as Blue
 Anthony Boswell as Little Brother
 Frantz Turner as Dalton
 Gretchen Palmer as Sweet Lorraine
 Harrison White as Tootsie Pop
 Helen Martin as Blue's Grandmother
 Joe Estevez as Lamar Hunt
 John Witherspoon as Mr. Mimm
 Mia X as Lola Mae
 Fiend as Roscoe
 Tommy "Tiny" Lister, Jr. as T-Lay
 C-Murder as O-Money
 Mr. Serv-On as Mad-Dogg
 Mystikal as Stupid
 Richard Keats as Jim Brady
 Sheryl Underwood as Bad Mouth Bessie
 Tangie Ambrose as Nasty Mouth Carla
 Ice Cube as Gun Runner
 Snoop Dogg as Pool Player/Bar Patron
 Silkk the Shocker as T-Lay's Friend 4#

Critical reception

Based on 12 reviews collected at Rotten Tomatoes, I Got the Hook-Up scored 17% with critics. Only two positive reviews came from the twelve that were cited, but one of the two positive reviews (Andy Klein of TNT’s Rough Cut) compared it favorably to the film Clerks.

Soundtrack

A soundtrack containing hip hop music was released on April 7, 1998 by No Limit Records. It peaked at #3 on the Billboard 200 and #1 on the Top R&B/Hip-Hop Albums.

Sequel

I Got the Hook-Up 2
In 2018, filming began on a sequel to the original film. Master P and Johnson returned as the stars.

I Got the Hook-Up 2 was released on streaming services and in very limited theatrical release on July 12, 2019.

References

External links
 
 
 
 
 

1998 films
American crime comedy films
Hood films
Dimension Films films
1998 directorial debut films
1990s English-language films
1990s American films
English-language crime comedy films